Westmoreland or Westmorland may refer to:

Places
Westmoreland County, New South Wales, Australia
Westmorland County, New Brunswick, Canada
Westmorland Parish, New Brunswick, Canada
Westmoreland Parish, Jamaica
Westmorland, New Zealand, a suburb of Christchurch, New Zealand
Westmorland, a historic county in England
Westmorland and Furness, a unitary authority area in England

United States
 Westmorland, California, or Westmoreland
 Westmoreland, Kansas
 Westmoreland, New Hampshire
 Westmoreland, New York, a town
 Westmoreland (CDP), New York, a census-designated place in the town
 Westmoreland, Queens, New York City
 Westmoreland, Tennessee
 Westmoreland, West Virginia
 Westmoreland County, Pennsylvania
 Westmoreland County, Virginia
 Westmoreland (Toledo, Ohio), a neighborhood
 Westmoreland, Portland, Oregon
 Westmoreland City, Pennsylvania
 State of Westmoreland (1784 failed proposal)

Electoral districts
Westmorland (electoral district), a federal electoral district in New Brunswick, Canada
Westmorland (provincial electoral district), a former provincial electoral district in New Brunswick, Canada
Westmorland and Lonsdale (UK Parliament constituency)
Westmoreland, Bath, an electoral ward in Bath, England

Institutions
Westmoreland County Community College, Pennsylvania, USA
Westmoreland Museum of American Art, Greensburg, Pennsylvania

Other uses 
 Westmoreland (railcar), the private railroad car of Henry Clay Frick
 Westmorland (ship), an 18th-century British privateer
 Westmoreland (ship), several ships
 Westmoreland Coal Company, a coal company in the Powder River Basin in Montana and Wyoming
 The Westmorland Gazette, a local newspaper based in Kendal, England
 Westmoreland Glass Company, a company that produced collectible art glass
 Westmoreland Mall, shopping mall in Greensburg, Pennsylvania
 Earl of Westmorland, a title in the Peerage of England
 Westmoreland station (DART), a light rail station in Dallas, Texas

People with the surname

Westmoreland 
 Andrew Westmoreland, President of Samford University in Birmingham, Alabama
 Keith Westmoreland, American politician
 Lynn Westmoreland, member of the United States House of Representatives from Georgia
 Wash Westmoreland, British director 
 William Westmoreland, United States Army general

Westmorland 
 Charles Henry Westmorland (1856–1916), British brigadier general
 Michele Westmorland, American photographer
 Percy Thuillier Westmorland (1863–1929), British lieutenant-colonel

Fictional 
 Charles Westmoreland, a character from Prison Break
 P.T. Westmorland, recurring character in Orphan Black

See also 
 City of Moreland

English-language surnames